Ronald Lee is a Canadian Romani writer, linguist and activist.

Ronald Lee or variation, may also refer to:

Sports
 Ronald Lee (cricketer) (1876–1940), English cricketer
 Ron Lee (American football) (born 1953), American football running back
 Ronnie Lee (American football) (born 1956), American football offensive tackle and tight end
 Ron Lee (born 1952), American basketball player

Others
 Ronald A. Lee (1912–1990), British philatelist
 Ronnie Lee (born 1951), British animal rights activist and the founder of the Animal Liberation Front
 Ronny Lee (1927–2015), American music teacher and guitarist

See also

 Ron Lea, Canadian actor
 Veronica "Ronnie" Lee, a fictional character from Schitt's Creek, see List of Schitt's Creek episodes
 Ronald (disambiguation)
 Ronnie (disambiguation)
 Ronny (given name)
 Ron (disambiguation)
 Lee (disambiguation)